Pauza may refer to:

Pauza P-50 rifle 1991-1997, developed by Robert Pauza 
"Pauza" (Bosnian "Pause"), song by Maya Berović  2016
Kevin Pauza American physiatrist